Aqsu (also Romanized as Āqsū and Āq Sū ; also known as Yengeh Deh) is a village in Khvoresh Rostam-e Jonubi Rural District, Khvoresh Rostam District, Khalkhal County, Ardabil Province, Iran. At the 2006 census, its population was 32, in 7 families.

References 

Tageo

Towns and villages in Khalkhal County